The Jhajha–Dibrugarh Weekly Express is an Express train belonging to Northeast Frontier Railway zone that runs between  and  in India, covering the states of Jharkhand, Bihar, West Bengal, Nagaland and Assam. It is currently being operated with 15941/15942 train numbers on a weekly basis.

Service

The 15941/Jhajha–Dibrugarh Weekly Express has an average speed of 45 km/hr and covers 1691 km in 37h 50m. The 15942/Dibrugarh–Jhajha Weekly Express has an average speed of 47 km/hr and covers 1691 km in 36h 20m.

Route and halts 

The important halts of the train are:

BIHAR
  (Starts)
 
 

JHARKHAND
 
 
 
 

WEST BENGAL
 
 
 
 
 
 
 
 
 
 
 New Malbazar Junction
 Dalgaon
 

NAGALAND
 

ASSAM
 Gossaigaon Hat
 
 Goalpara
 
 
 Lanka
 
 
 
 
  (Ends)

Coach composition

The train has LHB rakes with a max speed of 110 kmph. The train consists of 20 coaches:

 1 AC II Tier
 3 AC III Tier
 8 Sleeper coaches
 6 General Unreserved
 2 Luggage cum Generator car

Traction

From , train is hauled by a Diesel Loco Shed, Siliguri-based WDP-4D/WDP-4/WDP-4B Locomotive up till  and vice versa.

Direction reversal

The train reverses its direction 1 times:

See also 

 Jhajha railway station
 Dibrugarh railway station
 Rangiya–Dibrugarh Express

Notes

References

External links 

 15941/Jhajha - Dibrugarh Weekly Express India Rail Info
 15942/Dibrugarh - Jhajha Weekly Express India Rail Info

Transport in Dibrugarh
Express trains in India
Rail transport in Assam
Rail transport in Nagaland
Rail transport in West Bengal
Rail transport in Jharkhand
Rail transport in Bihar